Baldino is a surname which is shared by several notable people, including:

 Frank Baldino Jr., deceased American entrepreneur, co-founder of Cephalon
 Matthew Baldino, living American rower, competing at world-class level in the 1970s
 Phyllis Baldino, living American cross-genre artist